Little France is a suburb of Edinburgh, the capital of Scotland.

The area falls within the parish of Liberton in the south-east of the city. It acquired its name from members of the entourage brought to Scotland from France by Mary, Queen of Scots, who took up residence at nearby Craigmillar Castle. The French left the city following the siege of Leith, under the terms of the Treaty of Edinburgh.

Little France is the location of the Royal Infirmary of Edinburgh, and is adjacent to Craigour, which is just to its south.

Sources

See also
 BioQuarter

Areas of Edinburgh
France–Scotland relations
Auld Alliance